The Hopman Cup XXII (also known as the Hyundai Hopman Cup for sponsorship reasons) corresponds to the 22nd edition of the Hopman Cup tournament between nations in men's and women's tennis. The tournament started on 2 January 2010 at the Burswood Dome in Perth, Western Australia.

Eight nations competed.  They were formed of one man and one woman from the same nation.  The nations were split into two pools of four with the group winners contesting the final.

Slovakia were the defending champions but were not invited to participate in 2010, whilst Kazakhstan qualified for the event by winning the Asian Hopman Cup.

Spain won their third title, defeating Great Britain in the final 2–1.

Seeds

Group A

Standings

Australia vs. Romania

Spain vs. United States

Australia vs. United States

Spain vs. Romania

Pat Cash joined Cîrstea to take on the Spanish duo in the doubles over a Pro Set. The Spanish pair won 8–4.

Spain vs. Australia

Romania vs. United States

Group B

Standings

Russia vs. Germany

Great Britain vs. Kazakhstan

Great Britain vs. Germany

Russia vs. Kazakhstan

Russia vs. Great Britain

Germany vs. Kazakhstan

Final

References

External links

Hopman Cup
Hopman Cup
Hopman Cup
Hopman Cups by year